Bolshoye Vostroye is a rural locality (a village) in Nizhneyerogodskoye Rural Settlement, Velikoustyugsky District, Vologda Oblast, Russia. The population was 6 as of 2002.

Geography 
Bolshoye Vostroye is located 45 km southwest of Veliky Ustyug (the district's administrative centre) by road. Berezovo is the nearest rural locality.

References 

Rural localities in Velikoustyugsky District